Syzygium dyeriana is a species of plant in the family Myrtaceae. It is found in Thailand and Peninsular Malaysia.

References

dyeriana
Flora of Thailand
Flora of Peninsular Malaysia
Least concern plants
Taxonomy articles created by Polbot
Taxobox binomials not recognized by IUCN